Joel Scherban (born April 22, 1980) is a Canadian former ice hockey player who was selected by the Pittsburgh Penguins in the 7th round (196th overall) of the 1998 NHL Entry Draft.

Career

Player
After spending four years with the OHL's London Knights, Scherban continued his playing career with the Lakehead Thunderwolves, where he held the captaincy for five seasons. Scherban remained with the club until 2005-06, where he finished as the club's all-time leader in points (179).

Coaching
Scherban coached the CIS Lakehead Thunderwolves men's ice hockey team at Lakehead University, a position he has held from 2009 until four games into the 2012-13 season when he was relieved of his duties and replaced on an interim basis by former Philadelphia Flyers defenceman Mike Busniuk.

Awards and honours

References

External links

1980 births
Living people
Canadian ice hockey centres
Ice hockey people from Ontario
London Knights players
Pittsburgh Penguins draft picks
Sportspeople from Thunder Bay